Harley Francis Flanagan (born March 8, 1967) is an American musician. He is the founder of New York hardcore band Cro-Mags.

When he was nine years old, Flanagan published a book of poetry and drawings written when he was seven years old, with a foreword written by family friend Allen Ginsberg. At age 12, Flanagan was the drummer for New York punk band The Stimulators.

Influences 
Flanagan cited Darryl Jenifer, Geezer Butler, and Lemmy as his biggest bass influences. He also stated that Cronos of Venom, Jaco Pastorius (Flanagan owns one of his basses), and Stanley Clarke inspired him, trying to "bring all that stuff together" in his own music, mixed with hardcore's intensity.

Autobiography and reclamation of the Cro-Mags name 
Flanagan's autobiography, Hard-Core: Life of My Own, published by Feral House in 2016, contains an introduction by Steven Blush. Once published, the book spent over six months as the No. 1 seller in martial arts biographies on Amazon.

On May 19, 2018, Flanagan's band was one of four classic punk/hardcore acts to play the Prudential Center in Newark, New Jersey, along with Murphy's Law, Suicidal Tendencies, and the Original Misfits. Flanagan also released two recordings: The Dr. Know EP, proceeds of which benefit the titular Bad Brains member, who has medical expenses; and, released on July 6, 2018, The Original Cro-Mags Demos, 1982/83, which documents Flanagan's work writing the songs, playing all instruments and singing early versions of the songs that are blueprint for the Cro-Mags sound. That same year, Flanagan filed a federal trademark infringement action against former Cro-Mags bandmates, John Joseph and Mackie Jayson who had been touring under the Cro-Mags band name with other musicians against Flanagan's wishes.

In April 2019 Flanagan announced a settlement wherein he would own exclusive use of the name "Cro-Mags"; simultaneously, Joseph announced his recognition of the settlement, and that he and his band would instead perform as Cro-Mags "JM", beginning in August 2019. Flanagan is preparing a new Cro-Mags album with producer, Arthur Rizk for a planned 2019 release date. Subsequently, on June 28, 2019, Flanagan's Cro-Mags released their first new music in twenty years, three new songs "Don't Give In," "Drag You Under" and "No One's Victim." Flanagan is preparing a new Cro-Mags album with producer, Arthur Rizk for a planned 2019 release date. Cro-Mags are reportedly working on a new album — their first since 2000's Revenge — and were named as an opening act for the Original Misfits for four shows in 2019.

Personal life 
Flanagan is the father of two sons and is married to Laura Lee Flanagan, who is an attorney and serves as Flanagan's business manager and also works as general counsel and CCO to investment advisory firms.

Flanagan is a black-belt in Brazilian jiu-jitsu and currently works as a professor for Renzo Gracie Academy in New York City. His students include the daughter of Anthony Bourdain, who coincidentally attended NYC Stimulators concerts in the early 1980s, and was a fan of the then preteen drummer.

Flanagan has been a vegetarian since 1982.

Legal issues 
On July 6, 2012, Flanagan was arrested for allegedly stabbing two current members of Cro-Mags, and biting one of them, backstage at the Webster Hall in New York City. Allegedly, Flanagan had been attacked in the dressing room. Flanagan was stabbed in the leg. Flanagan stated he drew the knife to defend himself and that the wound to his leg required 30 stitches. Charges were dropped in December 2012, due to a lack of cooperating witnesses. Flanagan was later sued in a civil action over the incident, but this suit was also dropped.

In 2018, Flanagan filed a lawsuit in Federal District Court in the Southern District of New York, charging former band members John McGowan and Maxwell Jayson with trademark infringement. Flanagan won the lawsuit in April 2019, giving ownership and exclusive rights to the Cro-Mags band name.

Discography

with The Stimulators 
 Loud, Fast Rules!/Run Run Run (studio single, 1980)
 Loud, Fast Rules! (live concert recording, 1982)
 New York Thrash (various artists compilation, 1982)

with Cro-Mags 
 The Age of Quarrel (1986)
 Best Wishes (1989)
 Alpha Omega (1992)
 Near Death Experience (1993)
 Revenge (2000)
 In the Beginning (2020)

with White Devil 
 Reincarnation (1995)

with Harley's War 
Cro-Mag (2003)
Hardcore All-Stars (2009)
2012 (2012)

Harley Flanagan solo work 
Cro-Mags (2016)
Hard Core Dr. Know EP (2018)
Cro Mags Demos (2018; recorded 1982–1983)

References

External links 
HARLEY FLANAGAN

1967 births
Living people
American punk rock bass guitarists
Place of birth missing (living people)
Cro-Mags members
20th-century American bass guitarists